The 2013 ABN AMRO World Tennis Tournament (or Rotterdam Open) was a men's tennis tournament played on indoor hard courts. It took place at the Rotterdam Ahoy arena in the Dutch city of Rotterdam, between 11 and 17 February 2013. It was the 41st edition of the Rotterdam Open, whose official name is the ABN AMRO World Tennis Tournament. The competition was part of the ATP World Tour 500 series of the 2013 ATP World Tour. Second-seeded Juan Martín del Potro won the singles title.

Finals

Singles 

  Juan Martín del Potro defeated  Julien Benneteau, 7–6(7–2), 6–3

Doubles 

  Robert Lindstedt /  Nenad Zimonjić defeated  Thiemo de Bakker /  Jesse Huta Galung, 5–7, 6–3, [10–8]

Singles main-draw entrants

Seeds 

 Rankings are as of February 4, 2013.

Other entrants 
The following players received wildcards into the singles main draw:
  Thiemo de Bakker
  Gaël Monfils
  Igor Sijsling

The following players received entry from the qualifying draw:
  Matthias Bachinger
  Daniel Brands
  Ernests Gulbis
  Matteo Viola

Withdrawals 
Before the tournament
  Philipp Kohlschreiber
  Lukáš Lacko (right wrist injury)
  Michaël Llodra (illness)
  Radek Štěpánek

Retirements 
  Martin Kližan (cramping)
  Benoît Paire
  Mikhail Youzhny (hip injury)

Doubles main-draw entrants

Seeds 

 Rankings are as of February 4, 2013.

Other entrants 
The following pairs received wildcards into the doubles main draw:
  Thiemo de Bakker /  Jesse Huta Galung
  Robin Haase /  Igor Sijsling
The following pairs received entry as alternates:
  Stephan Fransen /  Wesley Koolhof
  Jerzy Janowicz /  Jarkko Nieminen

Withdrawals 
Before the tournament
  Michaël Llodra (illness)
  Mikhail Youzhny (hip injury)

References

External links 
 
 ITF tournament edition details

 
ABN AMRO World Tennis Tournament
ABN AMRO World Tennis Tournament
ABN AMRO World Tennis Tournament